Elections to Ards Borough Council were held on 20 May 1981 on the same day as the other Northern Irish local government elections. The election used three district electoral areas to elect a total of 17 councillors.

Election results

Note: "Votes" are the first preference votes.

Districts summary

|- class="unsortable" align="centre"
!rowspan=2 align="left"|Ward
! % 
!Cllrs
! % 
!Cllrs
! % 
!Cllrs
! % 
!Cllrs
! %
!Cllrs
! %
!Cllrs
! %
!Cllrs
!rowspan=2|TotalCllrs
|- class="unsortable" align="center"
!colspan=2 bgcolor="" | DUP
!colspan=2 bgcolor="" | UUP
!colspan=2 bgcolor="" | Alliance
!colspan=2 bgcolor="" | UPUP
!colspan=2 bgcolor="" | NILP
!colspan=2 bgcolor="" | SDLP
!colspan=2 bgcolor="white"| Others
|-
|align="left"|Area A
|bgcolor="#D46A4C"|32.0
|bgcolor="#D46A4C"|2
|24.7
|2
|9.6
|1
|14.3
|1
|0.0
|0
|11.9
|1
|7.5
|0
|7
|-
|align="left"|Area B
|bgcolor="#D46A4C"|40.2
|bgcolor="#D46A4C"|3
|14.1
|0
|12.6
|1
|16.0
|1
|17.1
|1
|0.0
|0
|0.0
|0
|6
|-
|align="left"|Area C
|bgcolor="#D46A4C"|39.5
|bgcolor="#D46A4C"|2
|28.8
|1
|15.5
|1
|6.1
|0
|0.0
|0
|0.0
|0
|10.1
|0
|4
|-
|- class="unsortable" class="sortbottom" style="background:#C9C9C9"
|align="left"| Total
|37.1
|7
|21.7
|3
|12.3
|3
|12.9
|2
|6.5
|1
|4.3
|1
|5.2
|0
|17
|-
|}

Districts results

Area A

1977: 3 x UUP, 2 x Alliance, 1 x DUP, 1 x SDLP
1981: 2 x DUP, 2 x UUP, 1 x UPUP, 1 x SDLP, 1 x Alliance
1977-1981 Change: DUP and UPUP gain from UUP and Alliance

Area B

1977: 2 x UUP, 2 x Alliance, 1 x NILP, 1 x DUP
1981: 3 x DUP, 1 x NILP, 1 x UPUP, 1 x Alliance
1977-1981 Change: DUP (two seats) and UPUP gain from UUP (two seats) and Alliance

Area C

1977: 1 x UUP, 1 x Alliance, 1 x DUP, 1 x Independent Unionist
1981: 2 x DUP, 1 x UUP, 1 x Alliance
1977-1981 Change: DUP gain from Independent Unionist

References

Ards Borough Council elections
Ards